The  34th Virgin Islands Legislature was a meeting of the Legislature of the Virgin Islands. It convened in Charlotte Amalie on January 11, 2021, during the third year of Albert Bryan’s governorship and ended on January 9, 2023.

In the 2020 elections, the Democratic Party of the Virgin Islands retained their majority although reduced from the 33rd Legislature.

Major events
 January 11, 2021: The 34th Legislative begins as senators take office.
 January 25, 2021: Governor Bryan delivered the State of the Territory Address.
 December 23, 2021: Senate voted 12-1 on Res. 34-0185 to suspend Senator Marvin Blyden and remove him from the position of Majority Leader for his failure to quarantine after testing positive for Covid-19.
 January 24, 2022: Governor Bryan delivered the State of the Territory Address.
 June 13, 2022: Senate President Donna Frett-Gregory calls for federal investigation into letter sent through USPS, threatening all 14 members of the body except Senator Steven Payne Sr.
 July 20, 2022: Senate voted 14-1 on Res. 34-0287 to expel Senator Steven Payne Sr. from the 34th Legislature following reports of sexual accusations made by three women.
 July 25, 2022: Angel Bolques replaces Senator Steven Payne Sr. as Senator at-large.
 December 29, 2022: Senate voted 11-1 on Bill No. 34-0345 to legalize recreational marijuana use in the territory, making USVI the most recent U.S. jurisdiction to do so.

Major Legislation

Enacted
 August 16, 2021:  Bill No. 34-0077 (Act No. 8469), the repayment of the 8% cut salary to government employees.

 February 8, 2022:  Bill No. 34-0188 (Act 8540), allows the Government of the Virgin Islands to seek funding in the bond market to stabilize GERS for 30 years. Sponsored by: Kurt Vialet, Donna Frett-Gregory, Janelle Sarauw

 April 11, 2022: The Virgin Islands CROWN Act, 34-0147 (Act 8553) ; Sponsored by: Senators Alma Francis Heyliger and Genevieve Whitaker + The Responsible Fatherhood Act, 34-0045 (Act 8546) ; Sponsored by: Milton Potter + Virgin Islands Uniform Law on Notarial Acts of 2021, 34-0155

 August 9, 2022:  Bill No. 34-0267, establishes a territorial park system. Sponsored by: Samuel Carrión

Proposed (but not enacted)
 Bill No. 34-0021, establishes the Public Services Commission as a semiautonomous agency; subjects the Waste Management Authority to regulation; and provides for resolution of customer complaints against wireless telecommunication providers. The bill also calls for a turnaround company to assess WAPA and measures to reduce the cost of electricity and water. Sponsored by: Senators Janelle Sarauw, Kurt Vialet (Veto by Governor: 5/20/2021 ; Override by Senate with a 13-0 vote on 08/3/2021)
 Bill No. 34-0168, eliminates the requirement for Caravelle Hotel casino owned by VIGL, to build a 400-capacity banquet hall. Sponsored by: Senator Kurt Vialet (Veto by Governor: 12/6/2021)

Party Summary

References

Virgin Islands